Mikorowo  is a village in the administrative district of Gmina Czarna Dąbrówka, within Bytów County, Pomeranian Voivodeship, in northern Poland.

The village has a population of 256.

References

Mikorowo

www.mikorowo.pl